Keith Brymer Jones (born June 1965) is a British potter and ceramic designer, known for his homeware Word Range with retro lettering and punk motifs.  In 2015, he debuted as an expert judge alongside Kate Malone on BBC2’s The Great Pottery Throw Down where his readiness to shed tears at the contestants' work attracted comment. He has continued his role and remained as judge when the programme transferred to More4 in 2020 and Channel 4 in 2021.

At the age of 11, the London-born Brymer Jones made his first pottery object – an owl. It was then that he knew he wanted to be a potter and, after a brief stint as the lead singer of British punk band The Wigs, he became an apprentice at Harefield Pottery in London. This is where he learnt to make modern ceramics.

After his apprenticeship, Brymer Jones started out hand-making ceramics for retailers including Conran Group, Habitat, Barneys New York, Monsoon, Laura Ashley and Heal's. He began to develop the Word Range for the first time; he was originally attracted to words because of their shapes, as he is dyslexic. Brymer Jones describes working with clay, shape and form as a natural affinity, as a result of his condition.

Brymer Jones also works as Head of Design for MAKE International. In this role he collaborates with other designers including Jane Foster, Scion Living, Hokolo and Becky Baur.
Brymer Jones is married to actress Marj Hogarth.
Brymer Jones published his autobiography in 2022: Boy in a China Shop: Life, Clay and Everything.

References

External links
 Keith Brymer Jones – professional website

British potters
Living people
Date of birth missing (living people)
1965 births
People with dyslexia